Marta Arce Payno (born 27 July 1977) is a B3 classified Spanish judo competitor who has represented Spain at the 2004, 2008 and 2012 Summer Paralympics where she has won a pair of silver medals and a bronze medal.

Personal 
Arce was born in Valladolid with a form of albinism that led to progressive loss of vision to the point where she lost all her sight.
She speaks four languages, Spanish, English, Italian and Japanese. She is a mother, giving birth in 2009. Her day job is being a physical therapist working for the Autonomous University of Madrid. In November 2013, she participated in a program run by the Programa ADOP Empleo to train Paralympic athletes in developing business communication and entrepreneurship skills.

Judo 
Arce is a B3 classified judo competitor. She started participating in judo after moving to Madrid to attend university.  Her entrance to the sport was through her brother who was active in it at that time.  From that point on, she did almost daily training in the sport.

The first IPC European Judo Championships Arce competed in were the ones hosted in Città di Castello where she picked up a gold medal. She competed at the European Championships held in 1999 in Italy. In 2001, she competed at a World Cup event in Rio de Janeiro. Competing at the 2004 Summer Paralympics, she won a silver medal.  The 2004 Games were the first time women's judo appeared on the Paralympic programme. At the 2008 Summer Paralympics in Beijing, she repeated her performance and won another silver medal. In October 2011, she competed in a regional Spanish national vision impaired judo event in Guadalajara. She competed at the London hosted 2012 Summer Paralympics  in judo, where she won a bronze medal. In her path to bronze, she competed against Swedish Nicolina Perheim and Cuban Dalidaivis Rodríguez Clark.  Her bronze was the second bronze medal won by Spain in judo at the London Games, coming minutes after teammate Maria Monica Merenciano won bronze.

References

External links 

 

1977 births
Living people
Spanish female judoka
Visually impaired category Paralympic competitors
Paralympic judoka of Spain
Paralympic silver medalists for Spain
Paralympic bronze medalists for Spain
Judoka at the 2004 Summer Paralympics
Judoka at the 2008 Summer Paralympics
Judoka at the 2012 Summer Paralympics
Medalists at the 2004 Summer Paralympics
Medalists at the 2008 Summer Paralympics
Medalists at the 2012 Summer Paralympics
Sportspeople from Valladolid
Paralympic medalists in judo
Spanish blind people